The women's giant slalom competition of the Beijing 2022 Olympics was held on 7 February, on "Ice River" course at the Yanqing National Alpine Ski Centre in Yanqing District. The Olympic champion was Sara Hector of Sweden, for whom this is the first Olympic medal. Federica Brignone of Italy won silver, and Lara Gut-Behrami of Switzerland bronze.

Mikaela Shiffrin was the defending champion. The silver medalist, Ragnhild Mowinckel, and the bronze medalist, Federica Brignone, qualified as well. At the 2021–22 FIS Alpine Ski World Cup, six giant slalom events were held before the Olympics. Sara Hector was leading the ranking, followed by Tessa Worley and Shiffrin. Lara Gut-Behrami is the 2021 world champion, with Shiffrin and Katharina Liensberger being the silver and bronze medalists, respectively.

In the first run, Hector skied the fastest, followed by Katharina Truppe and Brignone. Shiffrin did not finish the first run and thus could not defend the title. Gut-Behrami, eighth in the first run, set the fastest time in the second run. She remained on top until Brignone has finished, with Truppe and Hector still to go. Truppe was only third overall after her finish, guaranteeing a medal for Gut-Behrami. Hector skied the eight time of the run but still finished 0.28 seconds ahead of Brignone.

Sixth after the first run, Nina O'Brien crashed near the finish of her second run, badly fractured her leg, and was hospitalized.

Qualification

Results
Results are as follows:

References

Women's alpine skiing at the 2022 Winter Olympics